Elard Ostermann (born 15 October 1968) is a German former professional footballer who played as a midfielder.

References

External links
 

Living people
1968 births
German footballers
Association football midfielders
Bundesliga players
VfL Bochum players
Hamburger SV players
Hannover 96 players
Lüneburger SK players
Hamburger SV II players
FC Eintracht Norderstedt 03 players
Place of birth missing (living people)